This is a list of notable programming languages, grouped by type.

There is no overarching classification scheme for programming languages. Thus, in many cases, a language is listed under multiple headings (in this regard, see "Multiparadigm languages" below).

Array languages 

Array programming (also termed vector or multidimensional) languages generalize operations on scalars to apply transparently to vectors, matrices, and higher-dimensional arrays.

 A+
 Analytica
 APL
 Chapel
 Fortran 90
 FreeMat
 GAUSS
 Interactive Data Language (IDL)
 J
 Julia
 K
 Mathematica (Wolfram language)
 MATLAB
 Octave

 Q
 R
 S
 Scilab
 S-Lang
 SequenceL
 Speakeasy
 X10
 ZPL

Assembly languages 

Assembly languages directly correspond to a machine language (see below), so machine code instructions appear in a form understandable by humans, although there may not be a one-to-one mapping between an individual statement and an individual instruction. Assembly languages let programmers use symbolic addresses, which the assembler converts to absolute or relocatable addresses. Most assemblers also support macros and symbolic constants.

Authoring languages 

An authoring language is a programming language designed for use by a non-computer expert to easily create tutorials, websites, and other interactive computer programs.

 Darwin Information Typing Architecture (DITA)
 Lasso
 PILOT
 TUTOR
 Authorware

Concatenative programming languages 

A concatenative programming language is a point-free computer programming language in which all expressions denote functions, and the juxtaposition of expressions denotes function composition. Concatenative programming replaces function application, which is common in other programming styles, with function composition as the default way to build subroutines.

 Factor
 Forth
 jq (function application is also supported)
 Joy
 Kitten
 Lviv
 PostScript
 r3
 Staapl
 Trith
 xs
 8th

Constraint programming languages 

A constraint programming language is a declarative programming language where relationships between variables are expressed as constraints. Execution proceeds by attempting to find values for the variables which satisfy all declared constraints.

 Claire
 Constraint Handling Rules
 CHIP
 ECLiPSe
 Kaleidoscope

Command-line interface languages 
Command-line interface (CLI) languages are also called batch languages or job control languages. Examples:

 4DOS (extended command-line shell for IBM PCs)
 4OS2 (extended command-line shell for IBM PCs)
 bash (the Bourne-Again shell from GNU, Free Software Foundation (FSF))
 CLIST (MVS Command List)
 CMS EXEC
 csh and tcsh (C-like shell from Bill Joy at UC Berkeley)
 DIGITAL Command Language (DCL) – standard CLI language for VMS (DEC, Compaq, HP)
 DOS batch language (standard CLI/batch language for the IBM PC running DOS operating systems, popular before Windows)
 EXEC 2
 Expect (a Unix automation and test tool)
 fish (a Unix shell)
 Hamilton C shell (a C shell for Windows)
 ksh (a standard Unix shell, written by David Korn)
 PowerShell (.NET-based CLI)
 Rc (command-line shell for Plan 9)
 Rexx
 sh (the standard Unix shell, written by Stephen R. Bourne)
 TACL (Tandem Advanced Command Language)
 Windows batch language (Windows batch file language as understood by COMMAND.COM and CMD.EXE)
 zsh (a Unix shell)

Compiled languages 

These are languages typically processed by compilers, though theoretically any language can be compiled or interpreted.

 ActionScript
 Ada (multi-purpose language)
 ALGOL 58
 JOVIAL
 NELIAC
 ALGOL 60 (very influential language design)
 SMALL Machine ALGOL Like Language
 Ballerina (to bytecode for runtime (BVM))
 BASIC (including the first version of Dartmouth BASIC)
 BCPL
 C (one of the most widely used procedural languages)
 C++ (multiparadigm language derived from C)
 C# (into CIL, generates a runtime)
 Ceylon (into JVM bytecode)
 CHILL
 CLIPPER 5.3 (for DOS-based software)
 CLEO for Leo computers
 Clojure (into JVM bytecode)
 COBOL
 Cobra
 Common Lisp
 Crystal
 Curl
 D (from a reengineering of C++)
 DASL to Java, JavaScript, JSP, Flex as .war file
 Delphi (Borland's Object Pascal development system)
 DIBOL (Digital Interactive Business Oriented Language)
 Dylan
 eC
 Eiffel (developed by Bertrand Meyer)
 Sather
 Ubercode
 Elm
 Emacs Lisp
 Emerald
 Erlang
 F# (into CIL, generates runtime)
 Factor
 Fortran (first compiled by IBM's John Backus)
 GAUSS
 Genie
 Go (Golang)
 Gosu (into JVM bytecode)
 Groovy (into JVM bytecode)
 Haskell
 Harbour
 HolyC 
 Inform (usually story files for Glulx or Z-code)
 Java (usually JVM bytecode; to machine code)
 JOVIAL
 Julia (on the fly to machine code)
 Kotlin (Kotlin/Native uses LLVM to produce binaries)
 LabVIEW
 Mercury
 Mesa
 Nemerle (into intermediate language bytecode)
 Nim
 Objective-C
 P
 Pascal (most implementations)
 PL/I (originally for IBM mainframes)
 Plus
 Python (to intermediate VM bytecode)
 RPG (Report Program Generator)
 Rust
 Scala (into JVM bytecode)
 Scheme (e.g. Gambit)
 SequenceL – purely functional, parallelizing and race-free
 Simula (first object-oriented language, a superset of ALGOL 60)
 Smalltalk platform independent bytecode for a Virtual Machine
 Swift
 ML
 Standard ML (SML)
 Alice
 OCaml
 Turing
 Vala (GObject type system)
 Visual Basic (use Common Intermediate Language (CIL) JIT to native runtime)
 Visual FoxPro
 Visual Prolog
 Xojo

Concurrent languages 

Message passing languages provide language constructs for concurrency. The predominant paradigm for concurrency in mainstream languages such as Java is shared memory concurrency. Concurrent languages that make use of message passing have generally been inspired by process calculi such as communicating sequential processes (CSP) or the π-calculus.

 Ada – multi-purpose language
 Alef – concurrent language with threads and message passing, used for systems programming in early versions of Plan 9 from Bell Labs
 Ateji PX – an extension of the Java language for parallelism
 Ballerina – a language designed for implementing and orchestrating micro-services. Provides a message based parallel-first concurrency model.
 ChucK – domain specific programming language for audio, precise control over concurrency and timing
 Cilk – a concurrent C
 Cω – C Omega, a research language extending C#, uses asynchronous communication
 Clojure – a dialect of Lisp for the Java virtual machine
 Chapel
 Co-array Fortran
 Concurrent Pascal (by Brinch-Hansen)
 Curry
 E – uses promises, ensures deadlocks cannot occur
 Eiffel (through the SCOOP mechanism, Simple Concurrent Object-Oriented Computation)
 Elixir (runs on the Erlang VM)
 Emerald – uses threads and monitors
 Erlang – uses asynchronous message passing with nothing shared
 Gambit Scheme – using the Termite library
 Go (Golang)
 Haskell — supports concurrent, distributed, and parallel programming across multiple machines
 Java
 Join Java – concurrent language based on Java
 X10
 Julia
 Joule – dataflow language, communicates by message passing
 LabVIEW
 Limbo – relative of Alef, used for systems programming in Inferno (operating system)
 MultiLisp – Scheme variant extended to support parallelism
 OCaml
 occam – influenced heavily by Communicating Sequential Processes (CSP)
 occam-π – a modern variant of occam, which incorporates ideas from Milner's π-calculus
 Orc
 Oz – multiparadigm language, supports shared-state and message-passing concurrency, and futures, and Mozart Programming System cross-platform Oz
 P
 Pict – essentially an executable implementation of Milner's π-calculus
 Python — uses thread-based parallelism and process-based parallelism
 Rust
 Scala – implements Erlang-style actors on the JVM
 SequenceL – purely functional, automatically parallelizing and race-free
 SR – research language
 Unified Parallel C
 XProc – XML processing language, enabling concurrency

Curly-bracket languages 
Curly-bracket or curly-brace programming languages have a syntax that defines statement blocks using the curly bracket or brace characters { and }. This syntax originated with BCPL (1966), and was popularized by C. Many curly-bracket languages descend from or are strongly influenced by C. Examples of curly-bracket languages include:

 ABCL/c+
 Alef
 AWK
 B
 bc
 BCPL
 Ballerina
 C – developed circa 1970 at Bell Labs
 C++
 C#
 Ceylon
 ChucK – audio programming language
 Cilk – concurrent C for multithreaded parallel programming
 Cyclone – a safer C variant
 D
 Dart
 DASL – based on Java
 E
 eC
 ECMAScript
 ActionScript
 ECMAScript for XML
 JavaScript
 JScript
 TypeScript
 GLSL
 Go (Golang)
 HLSL
 ICI
 Java
 Processing
 Groovy
 Join Java
 Kotlin
 Tea
 X10
 Limbo
 LPC
 MEL
 Nemerle (curly braces optional)
 Objective-C
 PCASTL
 Perl
 PHP
 Pico
 Pike
 PowerShell
 R
 Rust
 S-Lang
 Scala (curly-braces optional)
 sed
 Solidity
 SuperCollider
 Swift
 UnrealScript
 Yorick
 YASS

Dataflow languages 
Dataflow programming languages rely on a (usually visual) representation of the flow of data to specify the program.  Frequently used for reacting to discrete events or for processing streams of data.  Examples of dataflow languages include:

 Analytica
 Ballerina
 BMDFM
 Hartmann pipelines
 G (used in LabVIEW)
 Lucid
 Max
 Oz
 Prograph
 Pure Data
 Reaktor
 StreamBase StreamSQL EventFlow
 Swift (parallel scripting language)
 VEE
 VHDL
 VisSim
 Vvvv
 WebMethods Flow

Data-oriented languages 
Data-oriented languages provide powerful ways of searching and manipulating the relations that have been described as entity relationship tables which map one set of things into other sets. Examples of data-oriented languages include:

 Clarion
 Clipper
 dBase a relational database access language
 Gremlin
 Mathematica (Wolfram language)
 MUMPS (an ANSI standard general-purpose language with specializations for database work)
 Caché ObjectScript (a proprietary superset of MUMPS)
 RDQL
 SPARQL
 SQL
 Visual FoxPro – a native RDBMS engine, object-oriented, RAD
 WebDNA

Decision table languages 
Decision tables can be used as an aid to clarifying the logic before writing a program in any language, but in the 1960s a number of languages were developed where the main logic is expressed directly in the form of a decision table, including:

 Filetab

Declarative languages 

Declarative languages express the logic of a computation without describing its control flow in detail. Declarative programming stands in contrast to imperative programming via imperative programming languages, where control flow is specified by serial orders (imperatives). (Pure) functional and logic-based programming languages are also declarative, and constitute the major subcategories of the declarative category. This section lists additional examples not in those subcategories.

 Analytica
 Ant (combine declarative programming and imperative programming)
 Curry
 Cypher
 Datalog
 Distributed Application Specification Language (DASL) (combine declarative programming and imperative programming)
 ECL
 Gremlin
 Inform (combine declarative programming and imperative programming)
 Lustre
 Mathematica (Wolfram language)
 Mercury
 MetaPost
 Modelica
 Prolog
 QML
 Oz
 RDQL
 SequenceL – purely functional, automatically parallelizing and race-free
 SPARQL
 SQL (Only DQL, not DDL, DCL, and DML)
 Soufflé
 xBase
 XSL Transformations

Embeddable languages

In source code 
Source embeddable languages embed small pieces of executable code inside a piece of free-form text, often a web page.

Client-side embedded languages are limited by the abilities of the browser or intended client. They aim to provide dynamism to web pages without the need to recontact the server.

Server-side embedded languages are much more flexible, since almost any language can be built into a server. The aim of having fragments of server-side code embedded in a web page is to generate additional markup dynamically; the code itself disappears when the page is served, to be replaced by its output.

Server side 
 PHP
 VBScript
 SMX – dedicated to web pages
 Tcl – server-side in NaviServer and an essential component in electronics industry systems
 WebDNA – dedicated to database-driven websites

The above examples are particularly dedicated to this purpose. A large number of other languages, such as Erlang, Scala, Perl, Ring and Ruby can be adapted (for instance, by being made into Apache modules).

Client side 
 ActionScript
 JavaScript (aka ECMAScript or JScript)
 VBScript (Windows only)

In object code 
A wide variety of dynamic or scripting languages can be embedded in compiled executable code. Basically, object code for the language's interpreter needs to be linked into the executable. Source code fragments for the embedded language can then be passed to an evaluation function as strings. Application control languages can be implemented this way, if the source code is input by the user. Languages with small interpreters are preferred.

 AngelScript
 Ch
 EEL
 Io
 jq (C and Go)
 Julia
 Lua
 Python
 Ring
 Ruby (via mruby)
 Squirrel
 Tcl

Educational programming languages 

Languages developed primarily for the purpose of teaching and learning of programming.

 Alice
 Blockly 
 Catrobat
 COMAL
 Elan
 Emerald
 Ezhil
 Logo
 KTurtle
 Mathematica (Wolfram language)
 Modula-2
 Pascal
 Racket
 Scheme
 Scratch
 Snap! 
 Turing

Esoteric languages 

An esoteric programming language is a programming language designed as a test of the boundaries of computer programming language design, as a proof of concept, or as a joke.

 Beatnik
 Befunge
 Brainfuck
 Chef
 INTERCAL
 LOLCODE
 Malbolge
 Piet
 Rockstar
 Shakespeare
 Thue
 Whitespace

Extension languages 
Extension programming languages are languages embedded into another program and used to harness its features in extension scripts.

 AutoLISP (specific to AutoCAD)
 BeanShell
 CAL
 C/AL (C/SIDE)
 Guile
 Emacs Lisp
 JavaScript and some dialects, e.g., JScript
 Lua (embedded in many games)
 OpenCL (extension of C and C++ to use the GPU and parallel extensions of the CPU)
 OptimJ (extension of Java with language support for writing optimization models and powerful abstractions for bulk data processing)
 Perl
 Pike
 PowerShell
 Python (embedded in Maya, Blender, and other 3-D animation packages)
 Rexx
 Ring
 Ruby (Google SketchUp)
 S-Lang
 SQL
 Squirrel
 Tcl
 Vim script (vim)
 Visual Basic for Applications (VBA)

Fourth-generation languages 

Fourth-generation programming languages are high-level languages built around database systems. They are generally used in commercial environments.

 1C:Enterprise programming language
 ABAP
 CorVision
 CSC's GraphTalk
 CA-IDEAL (Interactive Development Environment for an Application Life) for use with CA-DATACOM/DB
 Easytrieve report generator (now CA-Easytrieve Plus)
 FOCUS
 IBM Informix-4GL
 LINC 4GL
 MAPPER (Unisys/Sperry) – now part of BIS
 MARK-IV (Sterling/Informatics) now VISION:BUILDER of CA
 NATURAL
 Progress 4GL
 PV-Wave
 LiveCode (Not based on a database; still, the goal is to work at a higher level of abstraction than 3GLs.)
 SAS
 SQL
 Ubercode (VHLL, or Very-High-Level Language)
 Uniface
 Visual DataFlex
 Visual FoxPro
 xBase

Functional languages 

Functional programming languages define programs and subroutines as mathematical functions and treat them as first-class. Many so-called functional languages are "impure", containing imperative features. Many functional languages are tied to mathematical calculation tools. Functional languages include:

Pure 

 Agda
 Clean
 Coq (Gallina)
 Cuneiform
 Curry
 Elm
 Futhark
 Haskell
 Hope
 Idris
 Joy
 jq (but functions are 2nd class)
 Lean
 Mercury
 Miranda
 PureScript
 Ur
 KRC
 SAC
 SASL
 SequenceL

Impure 

 APL
 ATS
 CAL
 C++ (since C++11)
 C#
 VB.NET
 Ceylon
 D
 Dart
 Curl
 ECMAScript
 ActionScript
 ECMAScript for XML
 JavaScript
 JScript
 Source
 Erlang
 Elixir
 LFE
 Gleam
 F#
 Fexl
 Flix
 G (used in LabVIEW)
 Groovy
 Hop
 J
 Java (since version 8)
 Julia
 Kotlin
 Lisp
 Clojure
 Common Lisp
 Dylan
 Emacs Lisp
 LFE
 Little b
 Logo
 Scheme
 Guile
 Racket (formerly PLT Scheme)
 Tea
 Mathematica (Wolfram language)
 ML
 Standard ML (SML)
 Alice
 OCaml
 Nemerle
 Nim
 Opal
 OPS5
 Perl
 PHP
 Python
 Q (equational programming language)
 Q (programming language from Kx Systems)
 R
 Raku
 REBOL
 Red
 Ring
 Ruby
 REFAL
 Rust
 Scala
 Swift
 Spreadsheets
 Tcl

Hardware description languages 

In electronics, a hardware description language (HDL) is a specialized computer language used to describe the structure, design, and operation of electronic circuits, and most commonly, digital logic circuits. The two most widely used and well-supported HDL varieties used in industry are Verilog and VHDL. Hardware description languages include:

HDLs for analog circuit design 
 Verilog-AMS (Verilog for Analog and Mixed-Signal)
 VHDL-AMS (VHDL with Analog/Mixed-Signal extension)

HDLs for digital circuit design 

 Advanced Boolean Expression Language
 Altera Hardware Description Language
 Bluespec
 Confluence
 ELLA
 Handel-C
 Impulse C
 Lava
 Lola
 MyHDL
 PALASM
 Ruby (hardware description language)
 SystemC
 SystemVerilog
 Verilog
 VHDL (VHSIC HDL)

Imperative languages 
Imperative programming languages may be multi-paradigm and appear in other classifications. Here is a list of programming languages that follow the imperative paradigm:

 Ada
 ALGOL 58
 JOVIAL
 NELIAC
 ALGOL 60 (very influential language design)
 BASIC
 C
 C++
 C#
 Ceylon
 CHILL
 COBOL
 D
 Dart
 ECMAScript
 ActionScript
 ECMAScript for XML
 JavaScript
 JScript
 Source
 FORTRAN
 GAUSS
 Go
 Groovy
 Icon
 Java
 Julia
 Lua
 Mathematica (Wolfram language)
 MATLAB
 Machine languages
 Modula-2, Modula-3
 MUMPS
 Nim
 OCaml
 Oberon
 Object Pascal
 Open Object Rexx (ooRexx)
 Open Programming Language (OPL)
 OpenEdge Advanced Business Language (ABL)
 Pascal
 Perl
 PHP
 PL/I
 PL/S
 PowerShell
 PROSE
 Python
 Rexx
 Ring
 Ruby
 Rust
 SETL
 Speakeasy
 Swift
 Tcl

Interactive mode languages 
Interactive mode languages act as a kind of shell: expressions or statements can be entered one at a time, and the result of their evaluation is seen immediately. The interactive mode is also termed a read–eval–print loop (REPL).

 APL
 BASIC (some dialects)
 Clojure
 Common Lisp
 Dart (with Observatory or Dartium's developer tools)
 ECMAScript
 ActionScript
 ECMAScript for XML
 JavaScript
 JScript
 Source
 Erlang
 Elixir (with iex)
 F#
 Fril
 GAUSS
 Groovy
 Guile
 Haskell (with the GHCi or Hugs interpreter)
 IDL
 J
 Java (since version 9)
 Julia
 Lua
 MUMPS (an ANSI standard general-purpose language)
 Maple
 Mathematica (Wolfram language)
 MATLAB
 ML
 OCaml
 Perl
 PHP
 Pike
 PostScript
 PowerShell (.NET-based CLI)
 Prolog
 Python
 PROSE
 R
 REBOL
 Rexx
 Ring
 Ruby (with IRB)
 Scala
 Scheme
 Smalltalk (anywhere in a Smalltalk environment)
 S-Lang (with the S-Lang shell, slsh)
 Speakeasy
 Swift
 Tcl (with the Tcl shell, tclsh)
 Unix shell
 Visual FoxPro

Interpreted languages 
Interpreted languages are programming languages in which programs may be executed from source code form, by an interpreter. Theoretically, any language can be compiled or interpreted, so the term interpreted language generally refers to languages that are usually interpreted rather than compiled.

 Ant
 APL
 AutoHotkey scripting language
 AutoIt scripting language
 BASIC (some dialects)
 Programming Language for Business (PL/B, formerly DATABUS, later versions added optional compiling)
 Eiffel (via Melting Ice Technology in EiffelStudio)
 Emacs Lisp
 FOCAL
 GameMaker Language
 Groovy
 J
 jq
 Julia (compiled on the fly to machine code, by default, interpreting also available)
 JavaScript
 Lisp (early versions, pre-1962, and some experimental ones; production Lisp systems are compilers, but many of them still provide an interpreter if needed)
 LPC
 Lua
 MUMPS (an ANSI standard general-purpose language)
 Maple
 Mathematica (Wolfram language)
 MATLAB
 OCaml
 Pascal (early implementations)
 PCASTL
 Perl
 PHP
 PostScript
 PowerShell
 PROSE
 Python
 Rexx
 R
 REBOL
 Ring
 Ruby
 S-Lang
 Speakeasy
 Standard ML (SML)
 Spin
 Tcl
 Tea
 TorqueScript
 thinBasic scripting language
 VBScript
 Windows PowerShell – .NET-based CLI
 Some scripting languages – below

Iterative languages 
Iterative languages are built around or offering generators.

 Aldor
 Alphard
 C++
 C#
 CLU
 Cobra
 Eiffel, through "agents"
 Icon
 IPL-v
 jq
 Julia
 Lua
 Nim
 PHP
 Python
 Sather

Languages by memory management type

Garbage collected languages 
Garbage Collection (GC) is a form of automatic memory management. The garbage collector attempts to reclaim memory that was allocated by the program but is no longer used. 

 APL
 C#
 Clean
 Crystal
 Dart
 ECMAScript
 ActionScript
 ECMAScript for XML
 JavaScript
 JScript
 Source
 Emerald
 Erlang
 Go
 Groovy
 Haskell
 Java
 Julia
 Kotlin
 LabVIEW
 Lisp (originator)
 Arc
 Clojure
 Common Lisp
 Dylan
 Emacs Lisp
 Guile
 Racket
 Scheme
 Logo
 Lua
 ML
 Standard ML (SML)
 Alice
 OCaml
 Modula-3
 Perl
 PHP
 PowerShell
 Python
 Ring
 Ruby
 Smalltalk
 Speakeasy

Languages with manual memory management 

 Beef
 C
 C++
 Forth
 Fortran
 Modula-2
 Oberon
 Pascal
 Zig

Languages with optional manual memory management 
 Ada implementations are not required to offer garbage collection, but the language semantics support it, and many implementations include it.
 D provides programmers with full control over its own garbage collector, including the ability to disable it outright.
 Nim is usually garbage-collected or reference-counted by default, depending on its configuration, but the programmer may use the switch --mm:none to deallocate memory manually.
 Objective-C and Objective-C++ support optional reference counting and garbage collection as alternatives to manual memory management (the garbage collector was declared deprecated by Apple, however).
 Rust supports optional reference counting, but manual memory management is preferred.
 Vala uses reference counting by default, but the user is free to manage the memory manually if they wish.

Languages with deterministic memory management 

 Ada
 C
 C++
 Fortran
 Pascal
 Rust
 Objective-C
 Zig

Languages with automatic reference counting (ARC) 

 Objective-C
 Perl
 Swift
 Visual Basic
 Xojo

List-based languages – LISPs 
List-based languages are a type of data-structured language that are based on the list data structure.

 Lisp
 Arc
 Clojure
 Common Lisp
 Dylan
 Emacs Lisp
 Guile
 Racket
 Scheme
 Logo

 Joy
 R
 Source
 Tcl
 Tea
 TRAC

Little languages 
Little languages serve a specialized problem domain.

 awk – used for text file manipulation.

 Comet – used to solve complex combinatorial optimization problems in areas such as resource allocation and scheduling
 sed – parses and transforms text
 SQL – has only a few keywords and not all the constructs needed for a full programming language – many database management systems extend SQL with additional constructs as a stored procedure language

Logic-based languages 

Logic-based languages specify a set of attributes that a solution must-have, rather than a set of steps to obtain a solution.

Notable languages following this programming paradigm include:

 ALF
 Alma-0
 CLACL (CLAC-Language)
 Curry
 Datalog
 Fril
 Flix (a functional programming language with first-class Datalog constraints)
 Janus
 λProlog (a logic programming language featuring polymorphic typing, modular programming, and higher-order programming)
 Oz, and Mozart Programming System cross-platform Oz
 Prolog (formulates data and the program evaluation mechanism as a special form of mathematical logic called Horn logic and a general proving mechanism called logical resolution)
 Mercury (based on Prolog)
 Visual Prolog (object-oriented Prolog extension)
 ROOP
 Soufflé

Machine languages 
Machine languages are directly executable by a computer's CPU. They are typically formulated as bit patterns, usually represented in octal or hexadecimal. Each bit pattern causes the circuits in the CPU to execute one of the fundamental operations of the hardware. The activation of specific electrical inputs (e.g., CPU package pins for microprocessors), and logical settings for CPU state values, control the processor's computation. Individual machine languages are specific to a family of processors; machine-language code for one family of processors cannot run directly on processors in another family unless the processors in question have additional hardware to support it (for example, DEC VAX processors included a PDP-11 compatibility mode). They are (essentially) always defined by the CPU developer, not by 3rd parties. The symbolic version, the processor's assembly language, is also defined by the developer, in most cases. Some commonly used machine code instruction sets are:

 ARM
 Original 32-bit
 16-bit Thumb instructions (subset of registers used)
 64-bit (major architecture change)
 DEC:
 18-bit: PDP-1, PDP-4, PDP-7, PDP-9, PDP-15
 12-bit: PDP-5, PDP-8, LINC-8, PDP-12
 36-bit: PDP-6, PDP-10, DECSYSTEM-20
 16-bit: PDP-11 (influenced VAX and M68000)
 32-bit: VAX
 64-bit: Alpha
 Intel 8008, 8080 and 8085
 Zilog Z80
 x86:
 16-bit x86, first used in the Intel 8086
 Intel 8086 and 8088 (the latter was used in the first and early IBM PC)
 Intel 80186
 Intel 80286 (the first x86 processor with protected mode, used in the IBM AT)
 IA-32, introduced in the 80386
 x86-64 – The original specification was created by AMD. There are vendor variants, but they're essentially the same:
 AMD's AMD64
 Intel's Intel 64
 IBM
 305
 650
 701
 702, 705 and 7080
 704, 709, 7040, 7044, 7090, 7094
 1400 series, 7010
 7030
 7070
 System/360 and successors, including z/Architecture
 MIPS
 Motorola 6800 (8-bit)
 Motorola 68000 family (CPUs used in early Macintosh and early Sun computers)
 MOS Technology 65xx (8-bit)
 6502 (CPU for VIC-20, Apple II, and Atari 8-bit family)
 6510 (CPU for Commodore 64)
 Western Design Center 65816/65802 (CPU for Apple IIGS and (variant) Super Nintendo Entertainment System)
 National Semiconductor NS320xx
 POWER, first used in the IBM RS/6000
 PowerPC – used in Power Macintosh and in many game consoles, particularly of the seventh generation.
 Power ISA – an evolution of PowerPC.
 Sun Microsystems (now Oracle) SPARC
 UNIVAC
 30-bit computers: 490, 492, 494, 1230
 36-bit computers
 1101, 1103, 1105
 1100/2200 series
 MCST Elbrus 2000

Macro languages

Textual substitution macro languages 
Macro languages transform one source code file into another. A "macro" is essentially a short piece of text that expands into a longer one (not to be confused with hygienic macros), possibly with parameter substitution. They are often used to preprocess source code. Preprocessors can also supply facilities like file inclusion.

Macro languages may be restricted to acting on specially labeled code regions (pre-fixed with a # in the case of the C preprocessor). Alternatively, they may not, but in this case it is still often undesirable to (for instance) expand a macro embedded in a string literal, so they still need a rudimentary awareness of syntax. That being the case, they are often still applicable to more than one language. Contrast with source-embeddable languages like PHP, which are fully featured.

 cpp (the C preprocessor)
 m4 (originally from AT&T, bundled with Unix)
 ML/I (general-purpose macro processor)

Application macro languages 
Scripting languages such as Tcl and ECMAScript (ActionScript, ECMAScript for XML, JavaScript, JScript) have been embedded into applications. These are sometimes called "macro languages", although in a somewhat different sense to textual-substitution macros like m4.

Metaprogramming languages 
Metaprogramming is the writing of programs that write or manipulate other programs, including themselves, as their data or that do part of the work that is otherwise done at run time during compile time. In many cases, this allows programmers to get more done in the same amount of time as they would take to write all the code manually.

 C++
 CWIC
 Curl
 D
 eC
 Emacs Lisp
 Elixir
 F#
 Groovy
 Haskell
 Julia
 Lisp
 Lua
 Maude system
 Mathematica (Wolfram language)
 META II (and META I, a subset)
 MetaOCaml
 Nemerle
 Nim
 Perl
 Python
 Ring
 Ruby
 Rust
 Scheme
 SequenceL
 Smalltalk
 Source
 TREEMETA

Multiparadigm languages 

Multiparadigm languages support more than one programming paradigm. They allow a program to use more than one programming style. The goal is to allow programmers to use the best tool for a job, admitting that no one paradigm solves all problems in the easiest or most efficient way.

 1C:Enterprise programming language (generic, imperative, object-oriented, prototype-based, functional)
 Ada (concurrent, distributed, generic (template metaprogramming), imperative, object-oriented (class-based))
 ALF (functional, logic)
 Alma-0 (constraint, imperative, logic)
 APL (functional, imperative, object-oriented (class-based))
 BETA (functional, imperative, object-oriented (class-based))
 C++ (generic, imperative, object-oriented (class-based), functional, metaprogramming)
 C# (generic, imperative, object-oriented (class-based), functional, declarative)
 Ceylon (generic, imperative, object-oriented (class-based), functional, declarative)
 ChucK (imperative, object-oriented, time-based, concurrent, on-the-fly)
 Cobra (generic, imperative, object-oriented (class-based), functional, contractual)
 Common Lisp (functional, imperative, object-oriented (class-based), aspect-oriented (user may add further paradigms, e.g., logic))
 Curl (functional, imperative, object-oriented (class-based), metaprogramming)
 Curry (concurrent, functional, logic)
 D (generic, imperative, functional, object-oriented (class-based), metaprogramming)
 Dart (generic, imperative, functional, object-oriented (class-based))
 Delphi Object Pascal (generic, imperative, object-oriented (class-based), metaprogramming)
 Dylan (functional, object-oriented (class-based))
 eC (generic, imperative, object-oriented (class-based))
 ECMAScript (functional, imperative, object-oriented (prototype-based))
 ActionScript
 ECMAScript for XML
 JavaScript
 JScript
 Eiffel (imperative, object-oriented (class-based), generic, functional (agents), concurrent (SCOOP))
 F# (functional, generic, object-oriented (class-based), language-oriented)
 Fantom (functional, object-oriented (class-based))
 Go, Golang (imperative, procedural),
 Groovy (functional, object-oriented (class-based), imperative, procedural)
 Harbour
 Hop
 J (functional, imperative, object-oriented (class-based))
 Julia (imperative, multiple dispatch ("object-oriented"), functional, metaprogramming)
 LabVIEW (visual, dataflow, concurrent, modular, functional, object-oriented, scripting)
 Lava (object-oriented (class-based), visual)
 Lua (functional, imperative, object-oriented (prototype-based))
 Mathematica (Wolfram language)
 Mercury (functional, logical, object-oriented)
 Metaobject protocols (object-oriented (class-based, prototype-based))
 Nemerle (functional, object-oriented (class-based), imperative, metaprogramming)
 Objective-C (imperative, object-oriented (class-based), reflective)
 OCaml (functional, imperative, object-oriented (class-based), modular)
 Oz (functional (evaluation: eager, lazy), logic, constraint, imperative, object-oriented (class-based), concurrent, distributed), and Mozart Programming System cross-platform Oz
 Object Pascal (imperative, object-oriented (class-based))
 Perl (imperative, functional (can't be purely functional), object-oriented, class-oriented, aspect-oriented (through modules))
 PHP (imperative, object-oriented, functional (can't be purely functional))
 Pike (interpreted, general-purpose, high-level, cross-platform, dynamic programming language )
 Prograph (dataflow, object-oriented (class-based), visual)
 Python (functional, compiled, interpreted, object-oriented (class-based), imperative, metaprogramming, extension, impure, interactive mode, iterative, reflective, scripting)
 R (array, interpreted, impure, interactive mode, list-based, object-oriented prototype-based, scripting)
 Racket (functional, imperative, object-oriented (class-based) and can be extended by the user)
 REBOL (functional, imperative, object-oriented (prototype-based), metaprogramming (dialected))
 Red (functional, imperative, object-oriented (prototype-based), metaprogramming (dialected))
 ROOP (imperative, logic, object-oriented (class-based), rule-based)
 Ring (imperative, functional, object-oriented (class-based), metaprogramming, declarative, natural)
 Ruby (imperative, functional, object-oriented (class-based), metaprogramming)
 Rust (concurrent, functional, imperative, object-oriented, generic, metaprogramming, compiled)
 Scala (functional, object-oriented)
 Seed7 (imperative, object-oriented, generic)
 SISAL (concurrent, dataflow, functional)
 Spreadsheets (functional, visual)
 Swift (protocol-oriented, object-oriented, functional, imperative, block-structured)
 Tcl (functional, imperative, object-oriented (class-based))
 Tea (functional, imperative, object-oriented (class-based))
 Windows PowerShell (functional, imperative, pipeline, object-oriented (class-based))

Numerical analysis 
Several general-purpose programming languages, such as C and Python, are also used for technical computing, this list focuses on languages almost exclusively used for technical computing.

 AIMMS
 AMPL
 Analytica
 Fortran
 FreeMat
 GAUSS
 GAMS
 GNU Octave
 Julia
 Klerer-May System
 Mathematica (Wolfram language)
 MATLAB
 PROSE
 R
 Seneca – an Oberon variant
 Scilab
 Speakeasy

Non-English-based languages 

 Chinese BASIC (Chinese)
 Fjölnir (Icelandic)
 Language Symbolique d'Enseignement (French)
 Rapira (Russian)
 ezhil (Tamil)

Object-oriented class-based languages 
Class-based object-oriented programming languages support objects defined by their class. Class definitions include member data. Message passing is a key concept, if not the main concept, in object-oriented languages.

Polymorphic functions parameterized by the class of some of their arguments are typically called methods. In languages with single dispatch, classes typically also include method definitions. In languages with multiple dispatch, methods are defined by generic functions. There are exceptions where single dispatch methods are generic functions (e.g. Bigloo's object system).

Multiple dispatch 

 Common Lisp
 Cecil
 Dylan
 Julia

Single dispatch 

 ActionScript 3.0
 Actor
 Ada 95 and Ada 2005 (multi-purpose language)
 APL
 BETA
 C++
 C#
 Ceylon
 Dart
 Oxygene (formerly named Chrome)
 ChucK
 Cobra
 ColdFusion
 Curl
 D
 Distributed Application Specification Language (DASL)
 Delphi Object Pascal
 E
 GNU E
 eC
 Eiffel
 Sather
 Ubercode
 F-Script
 Fortran 2003
 Fortress
 Gambas
 Game Maker Language
 Harbour
 J
 Java
 Processing
 Groovy
 Join Java
 Tea
 X10
 LabVIEW
 Lava
 Lua
 Modula-2 (data abstraction, information hiding, strong typing, full modularity)
 Modula-3 (added more object-oriented features to Modula-2)
 Nemerle
 NetRexx
 Oberon-2 (full object-orientation equivalence in an original, strongly typed, Wirthian manner)
 Object Pascal
 Object REXX
 Objective-C (a superset of C adding a Smalltalk derived object model and message passing syntax)
 OCaml
 OpenEdge Advanced Business Language (ABL)
 Oz, Mozart Programming System
 Perl 5
 PHP
 Pike
 Prograph
 Python (interpretive language, optionally object-oriented)
 Revolution (programmer does not get to pick the objects)
 Ring
 Ruby
 Scala
 Speakeasy
 Simula (first object-oriented language, developed by Ole-Johan Dahl and Kristen Nygaard)
 Smalltalk (pure object-orientation, developed at Xerox PARC)
 F-Script
 Little Smalltalk
 Pharo
 Squeak
 Scratch
 IBM VisualAge
 VisualWorks
 SPIN
 SuperCollider
 VBScript (Microsoft Office 'macro scripting' language)
 Visual DataFlex
 Visual FoxPro
 Visual Prolog
 X++
 Xojo
 XOTcl

Object-oriented prototype-based languages 
Prototype-based languages are object-oriented languages where the distinction between classes and instances has been removed:

 1C:Enterprise programming language
 Actor-Based Concurrent Language (ABCL, ABCL/1, ABCL/R, ABCL/R2, ABCL/c+)
 Agora
 Cecil
 ECMAScript
 ActionScript
 ECMAScript for XML
 JavaScript (first named Mocha, then LiveScript)
 JScript
 Etoys in Squeak
 Io
 Lua
 MOO
 NewtonScript
 Obliq
 R
 REBOL
 Red
 Self (first prototype-based language, derived from Smalltalk)
 TADS

Off-side rule languages 

Off-side rule languages denote blocks of code by their indentation.

 ISWIM, the abstract language that introduced the rule
 ABC, Python's parent
 Python
 Cobra
 Boo
 Genie
 Miranda, Haskell's parent
 Orwell
 Haskell
 Curry
 Elixir (do: blocks)
 F#
 Nemerle (off-side optional)
 Nim
 Occam
 SPIN
 Scala (off-side optional)

Procedural languages 
Procedural programming languages are based on the concept of the unit and scope (the data viewing range) of an executable code statement. A procedural program is composed of one or more units or modules, either user coded or provided in a code library; each module is composed of one or more procedures, also called a function, routine, subroutine, or method, depending on the language. Examples of procedural languages include:

 Ada (multi-purpose language)
 ALGOL 58
 JOVIAL
 NELIAC
 ALGOL 60 (very influential language design)
 SMALL Machine ALGOL Like Language
 Alma-0
 BASIC (these lack most modularity in (especially) versions before about 1990)
 BCPL
 BLISS
 C
 C++ (C with objects plus much else, such as generics through STL)
 C# (similar to Java/C++)
 Ceylon
 CHILL
 ChucK (C/Java-like syntax, with new syntax elements for time and parallelism)
 COBOL
 Cobra
 ColdFusion
 CPL (Combined Programming Language)
 Curl
 D
 Distributed Application Specification Language (DASL) (combine declarative programming and imperative programming)
 eC
 ECMAScript
 ActionScript
 ECMAScript for XML
 JavaScript (first named Mocha, then LiveScript)
 JScript
 Source
 Eiffel
 Forth
 Fortran (better modularity in later Standards)
 F
 GAUSS
 Go
 Harbour
 HyperTalk
 Java
 Groovy
 Join Java
 Tea
 JOVIAL
 Julia
 Language H
 Lasso
 Modula-2 (fundamentally based on modules)
 Mathematica (Wolfram language)
 MATLAB
 Mesa
 MUMPS (first release was more modular than other languages of the time; the standard has become even more modular since then)
 Nemerle
 Nim
 Oberon, Oberon-2 (improved, smaller, faster, safer follow-ons for Modula-2)
 Component Pascal
 Seneca
 OCaml
 Occam
 Oriel
 Pascal (successor to ALGOL 60, predecessor of Modula-2)
 Free Pascal (FPC)
 Object Pascal, Delphi
 PCASTL
 Perl
 Pike
 PL/C
 PL/I (large general-purpose language, originally for IBM mainframes)
 Plus
 PowerShell
 PROSE
 Python
 R
 Rapira
 RPG
 Rust
 S-Lang
 VBScript
 Visual Basic
 Visual FoxPro
 Microsoft Dynamics AX (X++)

Query languages

Reflective languages 
Reflective languages let programs examine and possibly modify their high-level structure at runtime or compile-time. This is most common in high-level virtual machine programming languages like Smalltalk, and less common in lower-level programming languages like C. Languages and platforms supporting reflection:

 Befunge
 Ceylon
 Charm
 ChucK
 CLI
 C#
 Cobra
 Component Pascal BlackBox Component Builder
 Curl
 Cypher
 Delphi Object Pascal
 eC
 ECMAScript
 ActionScript
 ECMAScript for XML
 JavaScript
 JScript
 Emacs Lisp
 Eiffel
 Harbour
 Julia
 JVM
 Java
 Groovy
 Join Java
 X10
 Lisp
 Clojure
 Common Lisp
 Dylan
 Logo
 Scheme
 Lua
 Mathematica (Wolfram language)
 Maude system
 Oberon-2 – ETH Oberon System
 Objective-C
 PCASTL
 Perl
 PHP
 Pico
 Poplog
 POP-11
 PowerShell
 Prolog
 Python
 REBOL
 Red
 Ring
 Ruby
 Smalltalk (pure object-orientation, originally from Xerox PARC)
 F-Script
 Little Smalltalk
 Self
 Squeak
 IBM VisualAge
 VisualWorks
 Snobol
 Tcl
 XOTcl
 X++
 Xojo

Rule-based languages 
Rule-based languages instantiate rules when activated by conditions in a set of data. Of all possible activations, some set is selected and the statements belonging to those rules execute. Rule-based languages include:

 awk
 CLIPS
 Claire
 Constraint Handling Rules
 Drools
 GOAL agent programming language
 Jess
 Mathematica (Wolfram language)
 OPS5
 Prolog
 ToonTalk – robots are rules

Scripting languages 
"Scripting language" has two apparently different, but in fact similar, meanings. In a traditional sense, scripting languages are designed to automate frequently used tasks that usually involve calling or passing commands to external programs. Many complex application programs provide built-in languages that let users automate tasks. Those that are interpretive are often called scripting languages.

Recently, many applications have built-in traditional scripting languages, such as Perl or Visual Basic, but there are quite a few native scripting languages still in use. Many scripting languages are compiled to bytecode and then this (usually) platform-independent bytecode is run through a virtual machine (compare to Java virtual machine).

 AngelScript
 AppleScript
 AutoHotKey
 AutoIt
 AWK
 bc
 BeanShell
 Bash
 Ch (Embeddable C/C++ interpreter)
 CLI
 C# (compiled to bytecode, and running JIT inside VM)
 CLIST
 ColdFusion
 ECMAScript
 ActionScript
 ECMAScript for XML
 JavaScript (first named Mocha, then LiveScript)
 JScript
 Source
 Emacs Lisp
 CMS EXEC
 EXEC 2
 F-Script
 Game Maker Language (GML)
 GDScript
 ICI
 Io
 JASS
 Julia (compiled on the fly to machine code, by default, interpreting also available)
 JVM
 Groovy
 Join Java
 Ksh
 Lasso
 Lua
 MAXScript
 MEL
 Object REXX (OREXX, OOREXX)
 Oriel
 Pascal Script
 Perl
 PHP (intended for Web servers)
 PowerShell
 Python
 R
 REBOL
 Red
 Rexx
 Revolution
 Ring
 Ruby
 S-Lang
 sed
 Sh
 Smalltalk
 Squirrel
 Tea
 Tcl
 TorqueScript
 VBScript
 WebDNA, dedicated to database-driven websites
 Windows PowerShell (.NET-based CLI)
 Winbatch
 Many shell command languages such as Unix shell or DIGITAL Command Language (DCL) on VMS have powerful scripting abilities.

Stack-based languages 

Stack-based languages are a type of data-structured language that are based on the stack data structure.

 Beatnik
 Befunge
 Canonware Onyx
 Factor
 Forth
 Joy (all functions work on parameter stacks instead of named parameters)
 Piet
 Poplog via its implementation language POP-11
 PostScript
 RPL
 S-Lang

Synchronous languages 

Synchronous programming languages are optimized for programming reactive systems, systems that are often interrupted and must respond quickly. Many such systems are also called realtime systems, and are used often in embedded systems.

Examples:
 Argus
 Averest
 Esterel
 Lustre
 Signal
 Céu (programming language)

Shading languages 

A shading language is a graphics programming language adapted to programming shader effects. Such language forms usually consist of special data types, like "color" and "normal". Due to the variety of target markets for 3D computer graphics.

Real-time rendering 
They provide both higher hardware abstraction and a more flexible programming model than previous paradigms which hardcoded transformation and shading equations. This gives the programmer greater control over the rendering process and delivers richer content at lower overhead.

 Adobe Graphics Assembly Language (AGAL)
 ARB assembly language (ARB assembly)
 OpenGL Shading Language (GLSL or glslang)
 High-Level Shading Language (HLSL) or DirectX Shader Assembly Language
 PlayStation Shader Language (PSSL)
 Metal Shading Language (MSL)
 Cg
 Shining Rock Shading Language (SRSL)
 Spark
 Nitrous Shading Language
 Godot Shading Language

Offline rendering 
Shading languages used in offline rendering produce maximum image quality. Processing such shaders is time-consuming. The computational power required can be expensive because of their ability to produce photorealistic results.

 RenderMan Shading Language (RSL)
 Houdini VEX Shading Language (VEX)
 Gelato Shading Language
 Open Shading Language (OSL)

Syntax-handling languages 
These languages assist with generating lexical analyzers and parsers for context-free grammars.

 ANTLR
 Coco/R (EBNF with semantics)
 GNU bison (FSF's version of Yacc)
 GNU Flex (FSF version of Lex)
 glex/gyacc (GoboSoft compiler-compiler to Eiffel)
 lex (Lexical Analysis, from Bell Labs)
 M4
 Parsing expression grammar (PEG)
 Prolog
 Emacs Lisp
 Lisp
 SableCC
 Scheme
 yacc (yet another compiler-compiler, from Bell Labs)
 JavaCC

System languages 
The system programming languages are for low-level tasks like memory management or task management. A system programming language usually refers to a programming language used for system programming; such languages are designed for writing system software, which usually requires different development approaches when compared with application software.

System software is computer software designed to operate and control the computer hardware, and to provide a platform for running application software. System software includes software categories such as operating systems, utility software, device drivers, compilers, and linkers. Examples of system languages include:

Transformation languages 

Transformation languages serve the purpose of transforming (translating) source code specified in a certain formal language into a defined destination format code. It is most commonly used in intermediate components of more complex super-systems in order to adopt internal results for input into a succeeding processing routine.

 ATL
 AWK
 MOFM2T
 QVT

Visual languages 

Visual programming languages let users specify programs in a two-(or more)-dimensional way, instead of as one-dimensional text strings, via graphic layouts of various types. Some dataflow programming languages are also visual languages.

 Analytica
 Blockly
 Clickteam Fusion
 DRAKON
 Fabrik
 G (used in LabVIEW)
 Grasshopper
 Lava
 Max
 NXT-G
 Pict
 Prograph
 Pure Data
 Quartz Composer
 Scratch (written in and based on Squeak, a version of Smalltalk)
 Snap!
 Simulink
 Spreadsheets
 Stateflow
 Subtext
 ToonTalk
 VEE
 VisSim
 Vvvv
 XOD
 EICASLAB

Wirth languages 
Computer scientist Niklaus Wirth designed and implemented several influential languages.

 ALGOL W
 Euler
 Modula
 Modula-2, Modula-3, variants
 Obliq Modula 3 variant
 Oberon (Oberon, Oberon-07, Oberon-2)
 Component Pascal
 Oberon-2
 Pascal
 Object Pascal (umbrella name for Delphi, Free Pascal, Oxygene, others)

XML-based languages 
These are languages based on or that operate on XML.

 Ant
 Cω
 ECMAScript for XML
 MXML
 LZX
 XAML
 XPath
 XQuery
 XProc
 eXtensible Stylesheet Language Transformations (XSLT)

See also 
 Programming paradigm
 IEC 61131-3 – a standard for programmable logic controller (PLC) languages
 List of educational programming languages
 Esoteric programming language

Notes

References 

 
Array programming languages